Lisa-Marie Karlseng Utland (born 19 September 1992) is a former Norwegian footballer.

Career
Utland played 2010 season for the first division side IF Fløya which was eventually relegated at the end of the season. In 2012, she moved to Amazon Grimstad and scored seven goals in 23 games, helping the club narrowly avoid relegation. In 2013, she joined SK Trondheims-Ørn in Toppserien, for which she mainly played in the first team, but also appeared intermittently for the second team in the 2nd Division.

On 9 September 2019, Reading announced the signing of Utland.

In June 2020, Utland returned home to Norway and to her former team Trøndheims-Ørn who had just changed their name to Rosenborg Kvinner.

International career
Utland underwent several Norwegian youth teams. In September 2008, she participated with the U-16 team at the qualifying tournament in Estonia for the 2009 UEFA Under-17 European Championship where they qualified for the second qualifying round, that was held in Macedonia in April 2009. They reached the final round in Nyon, when Norway was fourth. In September of the same year she was part of the U-19 team that participated in the qualifying for the 2010 UEFA Under-19 European Championship and lost to Germany in second round, falling to qualify for the tournament. In 2012, she played a match for the U-20 team and in 2014 she played for the U-23 team. On 8 April 2015 she was called for a friendly match against Netherlands, but she did not play. On 14 May 2015 she was nominated for the final squad for the 2015 FIFA World Cup, the only Norwegian player, in the roster, without any senior cap. She then played on 23 May in a friendly against Belgium.

Career statistics

International goals

References

External links
 
 Team`s Player profile
 Eurosport Player profile
 NFF Player Profile

1992 births
Living people
People from Rana, Norway
Norwegian women's footballers
Women's association football forwards

Amazon Grimstad players
SK Trondheims-Ørn players
Røa IL players
FC Rosengård players
Reading F.C. Women players
Rosenborg BK Kvinner players

Toppserien players
Damallsvenskan players
FA Women's National League players

Norwegian expatriate women's footballers
Expatriate women's footballers in England
Norwegian expatriate sportspeople in England
Expatriate women's footballers in Sweden
Norwegian expatriate sportspeople in Sweden

Norway women's youth international footballers
Norway women's international footballers
2015 FIFA Women's World Cup players
2019 FIFA Women's World Cup players
Sportspeople from Nordland
UEFA Women's Euro 2017 players
Association football forwards